Santa Gertrudis Independent School District (SGISD) is a public school district in Kingsville, Kleberg County, Texas, United States. SGISD operates Santa Gertrudis Elementary and Academy High School. During the 2009-2010 school year, SGISD had 397 students enrolled, according to Texas Education Agency.

History of SGISD

Santa Gertrudis was formally established in 1917 as one of three schools associated with the King Ranch in South Texas. Today, Santa Gertrudis (now SGISD) is the only remaining school facility associated with the King Ranch.  The district boundaries are located within the Santa Gertrudis division of the King Ranch and a small part of La Paloma Ranch.
Santa Gertrudis ISD is fully accredited by the Texas Education Agency and has operated as an independent school district since 1942.  Prior to 1942, the district operated as a common school and in 1953 the district was formally recognized by legislative action.

In 1993, Santa Gertrudis began accepting nonresident transfer student from other area districts (before then the school was intended solely for children of King Ranch employees).  During the same year, the district also adopted a year around school calendar with four nine-week attendance periods, including two-week intersessions between attendance periods.  The school year begins late July and runs through late May (or early June).

Prior to 1994 Santa Gertrudis was solely a pre-kindergarten through eighth-grade school. After eighth-grade, students left the district and entered area high schools. It wasn’t until 1994 when a high school program, grades nine through twelve, was established in partnership with Driscoll Independent School District and Texas A&M University–Kingsville. The elementary school remains located on the King Ranch and the high school is located on the Texas A&M University Kingsville Campus.

Campus Construction
As of December 2009, SGISD is building a new campus for all students, located off of the King Ranch. This school is nearing completion and move in dates are scheduled for early 2010.

Santa Gertrudis Elementary School

Santa Gertrudis Elementary provides programs for pre-kindergarten through eighth-grade, and had 182 students enrolled during 2009-2010.  The school is known for quality educational programs, advanced technology, a small student to teacher ratio, and a safe and supportive educational environment.  Located in the heart of the King Ranch, Santa Gertrudis continues the tradition of educating the children of King Ranch that originated with the famed matriarch of Rancho Santa Gertrudis, Mrs. Henrietta M. King (1832–1925), wife of Mr. Richard King.

Academy High School
Academy High School is an innovative, restructured, non-traditional high school program, with 210 enrolled during 2009-2010, located on the campus of Texas A&M University–Kingsville.

Academy has a foundation of self-paced curriculum and authentic assessment. The non-traditional approach offers each student a program developed to meet individual needs and capabilities. Since students are allowed to progress at a pace conducive to their abilities, they can master course requirements and move on to the next higher level of work. Small class size allows extensive student-teacher interaction on a day-to-day basis.

History
Academy was approved by the Texas Education Agency in the spring of 1994 and the first year of operation was 1994-1995.  Through support from Texas A&M University Kingsville, qualified students are able to begin college courses starting in the ninth grade.  The first graduation in 1998 was held at Naval Airs Station Kingsville, and all 36 inaugural ninth grade students graduated.  Fifty percent of the graduating seniors had earned 12 or more hours of college credit while in high school, 80% earned three or more hours, and 80% of the class entered post secondary education following graduation. However thanks to new staff at Academy High School in the 2017-2018 school year, students are now being limited on the college courses that they are allowed to take.

Athletics
Prior to 2007, Academy High School did not have a football team.  In the fall of 07, Academy successfully played its first season of six-man football, with a junior varsity team and five away games (no home games).  During the first season, 44 athletes joined the team and became part of Academy High School history.

Entrepreneurship Program
In 1997, the Academy Entrepreneurship Program was established.  The program is a school-based business in which students manage all facets of a computer business, from building desktops and computer maintenance and repair, to technology training for faculty and staff.  The "Entre" program, Pride Computers, has built all the computers within the district, and it also performs all the computer maintenance for the district, including managing the network.

Advanced Studies Program
In the 2002-2003 school year, Academy, working in collaboration with Coastal Bend College, established an Advanced Studies Program, offering students the opportunity to graduate high school with an Associate of Applied Science Degree in Computer Information Technology.  Since the inception of the program, it has expanded to other career and degree areas within the community college.  Students also have the opportunity to take courses at Texas A&M University Kingsville, to earn credits applicable towards a four-year degree.   Students are allowed to take as many classes as desired, as long as they fit within a degree plan at an accredited university.  All college courses are tuition free to the students and are funded through several grants from the State and other sources. Key developers of the Entrepreneurship Program and the Advanced Studies Program were Bill Fette, District Technology Coordinator, and Thom Driver, District Network Administrator.  Bill Fette was the first to serve as Entrepreneurship Program Coordinator.

In 2005, due to the Advanced Studies Program, three students graduated with both a high school diploma and an associated degree from Coastal Bend College.  The three students were: Hailee Bugenhagen, Justin Walker, and Omar Gonzalez.

College hours earned by each graduating class
1998 – 117 credit hours, 36 students
1999 – 98 credit hours, 34 students
2000 – 85 credit hours, 39 students
2001 – 101 credit hours, 28 students
2002 – 141 credit hours, 26 students
2003 – 221 credit hours, 35 students
2004 – 531 credit hours, 40 students
2005 – 587 credit hours, 32 students
2006 – 509 credit hours, 33 students
2007 – 486 credit hours, 43 students

Demographics
The enrollment is 70.8% Hispanic, 27.2% Anglo, and 7% African American.

Attendance rates
Santa Gertrudis had a 98.08% overall attendance rate for the week of 02/22/2010 to 02/26/2010.
Pre-K = 99.26%
Kinder = 98%
1st Grade = 94%
2nd Grade = 100%
3rd Grade = 96%
4th Grade = 81.02
5th Grade = 100%
6th Grade = 97.89%
7th Grade = 99.05%
8th Grade = 98.89%

Academy High school had a 94.72% overall attendance rate for the week of 02/22/2010 to 02/26/2010.
9th Grade = 95.36%
10th Grade = 97.02%
11th Grade = 93.49%
12th Grade = 92.53%

School Board
Jesse Garcia - President
Carrie DeLaney – Vice-President
Catherine Montalvo – Secretary
Florinda Falcon – Trustee
Delia Perez – Trustee
Bobby Caldera – Trustee
Oscar Cortez – Trustee

See also

References

External links

SGISD Twitter
Santa Gertrudis Lion Student Facebook Page
New York Times: Diversity in the Classroom (2006 statistics)
2000 Performance Review by Texas Comptroller Carole Keeton Rylander

School districts in Kleberg County, Texas
Kingsville, Texas
1917 establishments in Texas
School districts established in 1917